Swing Phi Swing Social Fellowship, Inc. (SΦS) is a non-profit social fellowship, as opposed to a traditional Greek lettered sorority. It was founded as an alternative to historically Black sororities.

History

Swing Phi Swing was founded at Winston Salem State University in Winston-Salem, North Carolina, at the conclusion of the Civil Rights Movement and the burgeoning of the Black Power Movement. Twelve African-American women- with the help of their brother organization Groove Phi Groove, founded Swing Phi Swing on Friday, April 4, 1969, which was the one-year anniversary of the assassination of Dr. Martin Luther King, Jr. At a time of social unrest, these twelve young women created an organization that would honor the trailblazers of the Civil Rights Movement and their legacy.

These women dared to be different by challenging the traditional membership in Black Greek-Lettered organizations and chose to create a fellowship of women committed to meaningful community service, promoting and achieving academic excellence, and strengthening community involvement and engagement through culturally conscious events and activities.   Swing Phi Swing ignited a flame that influenced thousands of women to follow in their footsteps. Their pioneering spirit continues to burn in the hearts of many Sisters, transcending the boundaries of geography, social class, complexion, and religious affiliation.  Today, Swing has over 50 graduate and undergraduate chapters throughout the United States.

The twelve founders are:

Jeanette Butler
Anita Chase (Watson)
Beverly Dorn (Steele)
Finesia Dunovant (Walker)
Jane Harris (Madison)
Rosiland Marshall (Tandy)
Marilyn Reid (Hill)
Patricia Story (Edwards)
Ellen Tomlinson (Carter)
Brenda Travers (Satterfield)
Lorraine Watkins (Phillips)
Talma Woods (Brayboy)

The founding date is the one-year anniversary of the assassination of Dr. Martin Luther King Jr.

During the 1970s, Swing Phi Swing's membership grew as Black college women across the South, the Midwest and the East Coast heard of an afro-centric organization. Chapters were started at prominent Historically Black Colleges and Universities such as Hampton University (Hampton Institute), Morgan State University, Tuskegee University (Tuskegee Institute), Wilberforce University, Shaw University and North Carolina Agricultural and Technical State University.

On April 4, 2019, Swing Phi Swing celebrated their 50th anniversary in Winston-Salem, North Carolina during their National Convention. Ten of the surviving founders attended the convention and were present to describe how they founded the organization.

Demographics 

Swing Phi Swing Social Fellowship Inc. is divided into seven regions across the continental United States, Alaska, and Hawaii. Each region is directed by a Regional Director who monitors all chapters and members-at-large in her jurisdiction.

Regions

Mid-Atlantic DE | MD | OH | PA | VA | WV | DC
Midwest IL | IN | IA | KY | MI | MN | WI
Northeast CT | ME | MA | NH | NJ | NY | RI | VT
Northwest AK | ID | MT | NE | ND | SD | OR | WA | WY
South-Central AR | KS | LA | MO | OK | TX
Southeast AL | FL | GA | MS | NC | SC | TN
Southwest AZ | CA | CO | HI | NM | NV | UT

Leadership 
The National Organization of Swing Phi Swing Social Fellowship is managed and operated by Board of Directors, Executive Officers and Regional Directors.

National Presidents
1. Founder Marilyn Reid-Hill- 
2. Carlenia Graham Ivory- 
3. Debra Cauthen Jones/Donna Simmons- 
4. Linda Smith- 
5. Tanya McKoy- 
6. Cheryl Kornegay- 
7. Tanya Mckoy-Sutton- 
8  Sharon Chandler-Thomas- 
9.  Dr. Leone Lettsome-
10. Lori Gittens -
11. Debra McKoy-Present

Current Graduate Chapters
Ajeya Graduate Chapter -	Central New Jersey
Ashanti Zuri Graduate Chapter- Atlanta, GA
Atlanta Graduate Chapter - Atlanta, GA
Boston Graduate Chapter
Central Carolina Graduate Chapter - Raleigh, Durham
Charlotte Graduate Chapter - Charlotte, NC
Dada Rafiki Tri-County Graduate Chapter- PA
DC Metro Graduate Chapter   – Washington, D.C.
Detroit Graduate Chapter - Detroit, MI
DFW Graduate Chapter - Dallas-Fort Worth, TX
Garden State Graduate Chapter - Northern New Jersey
Hampton Roads Graduate Chapter - Hampton Roads, VA
Haraambe Graduate Chapter – Fayetteville, NC
Houston Graduate Chapter- Houston, TX
Imani Kuumba Graduate Chapter - New Jersey
Kemet PA Graduate Chapter - Pennsylvania
Los Angeles Graduate Chapter - Los Angeles, CA/Southern California
Mid South Graduate Chapter  – Memphis, TN 
The Greater New York & Connecticut Graduate Chapter - New York, Connecticut
New Jersey Zuri Obinrin Abike Aye' Graduate Chapter - New Jersey
Nia Maryland Graduate Chapter - Baltimore, MD
Niara Atanipenda Graduate Chapter - Greensboro, High Point
Okimma Delaware Graduate Chapter - Delaware
Palmetto Graduate Chapter - Charleston, SC
Potomac Graduate Chapter  - DC, Maryland, Virginia
Philadelphia Graduate Chapter - Philadelphia
Raleigh Graduate Chapter - Raleigh, NC
Richmond Graduate Chapter - Richmond, VA
Rukiya Busara Piedmont Triad Graduate Chapter – Winston-Salem, NC
Sankofa Graduate Chapter - Las Vegas, Nevada/Southern California
Siku Mpya Graduate Chapter- Florida
Tri-State Graduate Chapter - New York, New Jersey, Connecticut

Current Undergraduate Chapters 

Abeo Neema Undergraduate Chapter - University of Michigan
Aggie Undergraduate Chapter- North Carolina Agricultural and Technical State University
Ainka Makeda Marali Moliehi Undergraduate Chapter - Pennsylvania State University
Andile Engara Undergraduate Chapter - University of North Carolina - Greensboro
Awon Egbe Obirin Otito Undergraduate Chapter - Grambling State University
Bison Undergraduate Chapter - Howard University
Ebony Undergraduate Chapter - South Carolina State University and Benedict College
Endesha Baraka Eagle Chapter - Coppin State University
Gendaga Bimbisha Tabu Undergraduate Chapter - Lincoln University
Golden Undergraduate Chapter - Johnson C. Smith University
Mother (Groove) Undergraduate Chapter - Winston-Salem State University
Harambee II  - Spelman College and Clark Atlanta University
Maatkare Hatshepsut Bulldog Undergraduate Chapter - Bowie State University
Maisha New Birth Undergraduate Chapter - University of Maryland-Eastern Shore
Maraabe Undergraduate Chapter - Rosemont College, University of Pennsylvania, Drexel University, and Temple University
Marali Nubia Bear Undergraduate Chapter - Morgan State University, Towson University
Masika Ghayda Niara Undergraduate Chapter - College of New Rochelle
Muntu Undergraduate Chapter - Shaw University
Nandi Undergraduate Chapter - Rutgers University
Ndada Amuka Kwa Pindua Undergraduate Chapter - Adelphi University
Ndada Vumilia Daima Inuka Undergraduate Chapter - Mercy College
Ndada Weuse Panda Undergraduate Chapter - Montclair State University
Nguvu Katika Mwanzo Mpya Undergraduate Chapter - Loyola University New Orleans
Njoki Mayasa Nyawela Undergraduate Chapter - Cheyney University of Pennsylvania
Nkijha Undergraduate Chapter - St. Augustine's University
Odu Ifa Undergraduate Chapter - Virginia Commonwealth University
Osei Fola Simba Undergraduate Chapter - Syracuse University
SOBU Undergraduate Chapter - North Carolina Central University
Spartan Undergraduate Chapter - Norfolk State University
Subira Chemwuapu Undergraduate Chapter - Johnson & Wales University, Providence RI
SUNY Undergraduate Chapter -State University of New York, Albany NY
Siyanda Undergraduate Chapter - East Carolina University
Umoja Undergraduate Chapter - Livingstone College
Upenda Undergraduate Chapter - Hampton University
Harambee I Undergraduate Chapter - Elizabeth City State University

References

External links
 National Website
 

Student societies in the United States
1969 establishments in North Carolina
Student organizations established in 1969